Thomas S. Allen (1876–1919), an early figure in Tin Pan Alley, was an American vaudeville composer, manager, and violinist. He was born in Natick, Massachusetts, and died in Boston.

Popular songs
In 1902, his popular fusion of schottische and ragtime, "Any Rags", became a major hit.

Modern impact
 "Whip and Spur" (1902) is performed at circuses and rodeos.
 "Low Bridge, Everybody Down", also known as "Fifteen Years on the Erie Canal" or "Fifteen Miles on the Erie Canal" (1913) is a well-known song, often referred to as a folk song. Included in the Seeger Sessions, folk album by Bruce Springsteen 
 T. S. Eliot spliced lines together from two songs for The Waste Land.

References

External links
 List of Works
 Erie Canal Song by Thomas S. Allen

The list of Allen's works omits his 1914 composition "I Wonder What Will William Tell", Music by "X, with apologies to G. Rossini", Daly Music Publishing, Boston Mass.

1876 births
1919 deaths
People from Natick, Massachusetts
American male composers
American composers
American violinists
American male violinists
Vaudeville performers